Cymindis lateralis is a species of ground beetle in the subfamily Harpalinae. It was described by Fischer Von Waldheim in 1820.

References

lateralis
Beetles described in 1820